This is a list of lieutenant governors of the U.S. state of Iowa.

History
Prior to 1990, the governor and lieutenant governor were elected in separate elections; since then they have run together on the same ticket.

List

See also
 List of governors of Iowa

Notes

References

Lists of Iowa officeholders
 
Iowa